A partial solar eclipse occurred on March 18–19, 2007. A solar eclipse occurs when the Moon passes between Earth and the Sun, thereby totally or partly obscuring the image of the Sun for a viewer on Earth. A partial solar eclipse occurs in the polar regions of the Earth when the center of the Moon's shadow misses the Earth.

This partial eclipse was visible from India at sunrise, across Asia and eastern part of European Russia, and ending near sunset over northern Alaska. The greatest eclipse was on north of Perm Krai, Russia. This was the second eclipse of the eclipse season, the first being the March 2007 lunar eclipse.

Visibility

Images

Related eclipses

Eclipses of 2007 
 A total lunar eclipse on March 3.
 A partial solar eclipse on March 19.
 A total lunar eclipse on August 28.
 A partial solar eclipse on September 11.

Solar eclipses 2004–2007

Saros 149

Metonic series

References

 NASA graphics
 NASA map
 Besselian Elements - Partial Solar Eclipse of 2007 March 19

Photos:
 Spaceweather.com eclipse gallery
 
 
 Solar Eclipse - 19th March 2007 Deepu George V Mananthavady, Wayanad, Kerala, India
 

2007 03 19
2007 in science
2007 03 19
March 2007 events